The 1992–93 season was PAOK Football Club's 66th in existence and the club's 34th consecutive season in the top flight of Greek football. The team entered the Greek Football Cup in first round and faced Paris Saint-Germain in the 1st round of the UEFA Cup. The season was marked by the eventful second leg tie against Paris Saint-Germain which was abandoned after 51 mins due to crowd violence. PAOK were punished with a two-year ban from all European competitions by the UEFA disciplinary committee. The sentence was later reduced to one year.

Players

Squad

Transfers

Players transferred in

Players transferred out

Kit

Pre-season

Competitions

Overview

Managerial statistics

Alpha Ethniki

Standings

Results summary

Results by round

Matches

Greek Cup

First round (group stage)

Second round

UEFA Cup

First round

Statistics

Squad statistics

! colspan="13" style="background:#DCDCDC; text-align:center" | Goalkeepers
|-

! colspan="13" style="background:#DCDCDC; text-align:center" | Defenders
|-

! colspan="13" style="background:#DCDCDC; text-align:center" | Midfielders
|-

! colspan="13" style="background:#DCDCDC; text-align:center" | Forwards
|-

|}	

Source: Match reports in competitive matches, rsssf.com

Goalscorers

Source: Match reports in competitive matches, rsssf.com

External links
 www.rsssf.com
 PAOK FC official website

References 

PAOK FC seasons
PAOK